Santo Domingo, officially the Municipality of Santo Domingo, is a 3rd class municipality in the province of Ilocos Sur, Philippines. According to the 2020 census, it has a population of 29,041 people.

Etymology
The name of the municipality came from its old moniker, "Paggappuan ti Santol ti Domingo," an Ilocano term meaning "The source of the Santol sold every Sunday."  Santol (Sandoricum koetjape) is the name of the tree bearing round, yellowish fruits growing in abundance in the municipality, notably in Barangay Pussuac.

History
During the Spanish era, an enlisted man of the Spanish Civil Guard, Pablo Arquero, looked for the source of the santol being sold in the markets of Ciudad Fernandina (now Vigan City) on Sundays during the months of June to August. To do so, he asked for a leave of absence from his platoon leader to trace the source of the fruits. With his Ilocano guide, he searched the lands north of Villa Fernandina. He found nothing in the neighboring towns of Bantay, Santa Catalina, San Vicente, and Bantaoay (now San Ildefonso). He finally found many santol-bearing trees in a place north of Bantaoay now called Barangay Pus-uac. He has found the "Paggappuan ti Santol ti Domingo."  The town was named Santo Domingo on account of this feat.

Don Pablo Arguero was claimed to be the founder of the municipality on May 12, 1742, with Father Tomas Millan as the first parish priest. Father Millan laid the foundation of the belfry, where the great Filipino hero Diego Silang once worked as a boy.

In 2010, the University of Northern Philippines opened a campus in Quimmarayan. It houses the university's agricultural, fishery and research courses; and the Environmental Research and Training Center.

Geography

Barangays
Santo Domingo is politically subdivided into 36 barangays. These barangays are headed by elected officials: Barangay Captain, Barangay Council, whose members are called Barangay Councilors. All are elected every three years.

Climate

Demographics

In the 2020 census, Santo Domingo had a population of 29,041.

Economy

Government
Santo Domingo, belonging to the first congressional district of the province of Ilocos Sur, is governed by a mayor designated as its local chief executive and by a municipal council as its legislative body in accordance with the Local Government Code. The mayor, vice mayor, and the councilors are elected directly by the people through an election which is being held every three years.

Elected officials

List of local chief executives
For 378 years, from 1521 to 1899, Local Chief Executives of the “pueblos” or town were appointed by the Spaniards and in the year 1901 up to 1946 they were appointed by Americans. Afterwards, election was the mode of selection.

Gobernadorcillos (1742-1892):

''Capitan Municipal (1893-1899): Don Wenceslao Soliven
 Don Isabelo SolivenPresidentes Municipal'':

Municipal Mayors:

References

External links
Official Website of Municipality of Santo Domingo, Ilocos Sur
Pasyalang Ilocos Sur
Municipality of Santo Domingo Ilocos Sur
Philippine Standard Geographic Code
Philippine Census Information
Local Governance Performance Management System

Municipalities of Ilocos Sur